Burlington Public Library, Burlington Carnegie Library, or Burlington Carnegie Free Library, may refer to:

in Canada
Burlington Public Library (Ontario)

in the United States
Burlington Public Library (Burlington, Iowa), listed on the National Register of Historic Places in Des Moines County, Iowa
Burlington Carnegie Free Library (Burlington, Kansas), listed on the National Register of Historic Places in Kansas
Burlington Public Library (Burlington, Massachusetts)
Burlington Carnegie Library (Burlington, Washington), listed on the National Register of Historic Places in Skagit County, Washington